Only Love, L is the fifth studio album by German singer Lena Meyer-Landrut. It was released by Polydor Records on 5 April 2019. The album includes the singles "Thank You" and "Don't Lie to Me", with production from Beatgees, Jugglerz, and Jr Blender. It peaked at number 2 on the German Albums Chart, and entered the five in Austria. The album was re-released as More Love Edition on 6 December 2019, with the songs "Better" and "It Takes Two", as well as acoustic versions of "Thank You", "Don't Lie to Me", "Skinny Bitch" and "Better". Musically it's described as a Pop album that incorporates elements of Dancehall, Trap and R&B.

Singles
The album's lead single "Thank You" was released on 16 November 2018. The song's music video was released on 29 November 2018 and was directed by Mario Clement. The song debuted and peaked at number 40 in Germany. "Don't Lie to Me" was released as the album's second single on 15 March 2019. The song's music video was released on the same day and was directed by Paul Ripke. The song debuted at number 63 and peaked at number 30 in Germany.

"Sex in the Morning" featuring Ramz was released on 29 March 2019 as the first promotional single from the album. "Boundaries" was used in the German campaign for the movie Dark Phoenix. The official music video was released on 17 May 2019. A music video for "Love" was released as an IGTV video on 28 June 2019. On 3 July 2019 the video was published on YouTube. "Better" with Nico Santos was released as a single on 16 August 2019. It was later included on the album's More Love Edition. "Skinny Bitch" was released as a single on 24 January 2020, along with a music video directed by Paul Hüttemann.

Track listing

Notes
All track titles are stylised in all lowercase.

Charts

Weekly charts

Year-end charts

Release history

References

External links
 

2019 albums
Lena Meyer-Landrut albums